Chaika or Chayka (meaning seagull) is a gender-neutral Slavic surname. It may refer to

 Alyaksandr Chayka (born 1976), Belarusian football coach
 John Chayka (born 1989), former general manager of the Arizona Coyotes
 Viktoria Chaika (born 1980), Belarusian sport shooter
 Yury Chaika (born 1951), Russian Prosecutor General

See also

Chika (general name)